Arm in Arm Down the Street is a 1966 Argentine and Spanish comedy-drama film directed by Enrique Carreras and starring Rodolfo Bebán, Evangelina Salazar and Susana Campos. It won the Silver Condor Award for Best Film, given by the Argentine Film Critics Association in 1967 for the best picture of the previous year.

Cast
Rodolfo Bebán
Evangelina Salazar
Susana Campos
Enzo Viena
Luis Tasca
Maruja Gil Quesada
Javier Portales
Lilian Valmar
Rodolfo López Ervilha
Mirtha Dabner

References

External links
 

1966 films
1960s Spanish-language films
1966 comedy-drama films
Argentine comedy-drama films
Argentine black-and-white films
Spanish black-and-white films
Spanish comedy-drama films
1960s Argentine films
Films directed by Enrique Carreras